David "Dai" Bradley (born 27 September 1953) is an English actor known for his debut role of Billy Casper in the critically acclaimed 1969 film Kes, directed by Ken Loach.

Early life
David Bradley was born in the hamlet of Stubbs, near Barnsley. His mother was Nora, a seamstress, and his father was Horace "Pop" Bradley, a miner who worked from North Gawber Colliery. By his own account, he had an "unremarkable" childhood, and was not involved in any acting apart from amateur Christmas pantos.

Career 
At the age of 14, he gained the part of Billy Casper in Kes. Bradley has said that the making of the film was a happy one. The cast was "like one huge family" and he spent much of his time playing with the other young boys who appeared in the film. One of his least favorite memories was of the filming of the football scene, which he recalled in an interview: "They chose the worst day of the summer for that scene. They had a local fire engine come round and flood the field with hundreds of gallons of water. Although it was August, it was bloody cold and freezing." 

Bradley spent several hours after each day's filming training with the three kestrels used in the film. One of the birds did not take to the training, and had to be reintroduced to the wild. Director Ken Loach often used unique methods to elicit authentic emotional reactions from Bradley, such as surprising him with a barking dog, caning him unexpectedly, and telling him that his costar would truly kill a kestrel for the final scene.

He received BAFTA's Award for Best Newcomer for his role. The film required extensive time training the two kestrels used for the film. One critic called Bradley's performance "one of the great adolescent portraits in cinema, joining the likes of Jean-Pierre Leaud in The 400 Blows".

Bradley left school at the age of 17. He moved to London and began training as an actor with the  National Theatre Company. In time, he worked with Anthony Hopkins, Joan Plowright and Derek Jacobi. Bradley changed his first name to Dai when he joined Equity, the actors' union, who already had an actor named David Bradley on their books.

Later projects 

After Kes was released in 1970, Bradley joined the cast of the children's television programme The Flaxton Boys as Peter Weekes in series two, and starred as Terry Connor in the children's adventure serial The Jensen Code in 1973. He also had guest roles in episodes of popular, established drama series such as Z Cars and A Family at War.

While he did not receive the same media attention for his subsequent film performances as he did for Kes, Bradley received solid reviews for his theatre acting. He was cast as Alan Strang in Peter Shaffer's Equus during the mid-1970s. After he succeeded Peter Firth in the role at the Old Vic in London, the production embarked on a 2½-year worldwide tour. In the United States national production, he starred with Brian Bedford, and earned standing ovations and a Los Angeles Drama Critics Circle nomination for Best Actor. Of his performance of the role at the Wilbur Theatre, The Harvard Crimson commented that "Bradley has the most difficult role to play in Equus and he is outstanding." Likewise, his portrayal of the character was praised as being "profoundly sensitive", with reviewer Mark J. Bly of The Heights calling the production "equally as good as its New York counterpart and by all means...not [to] be missed." Bradley also played the role opposite John Fraser in South Africa. He was offered the opportunity to take over the role in the Broadway production, but turned it down due to exhaustion. 
 
Additional theatre roles during the 70s included Souplier in Henry de Montherlant's The Fire that Consumes with Nigel Hawthorne, which was staged in 1977 at the Mermaid Theatre. The play, which concerns a priest who is obsessed with a young student, was the recipient of the Society of West End Theatre Award for Play of the Year (now the Olivier Award) and, with Bradley contributing what was referred to as "a beautifully spontaneous performance" as the student opposite Hawthorne's guilt-ridden Abbé de Pradts. Earlier in the decade, Bradley was featured as Hanschen Rilow in the Old Vic's production of Frank Wedekind's controversial tale of sexual discovery, violence, and repression, Spring Awakening, of which Plays and Players stated that "Dai Bradley's Hans is a virtuoso effort, full of awkward and loquacious passion." The production also garnered strong reviews for co-stars Michael Kitchen, Peter Firth, Veronica Quilligan, and Gerard Ryder as the object of Hanschen's forbidden affection, Ernst.

Bradley played notable roles in several 1970s films including Malachi's Cove (1973), Absolution (1978), All Quiet on the Western Front (1979) and the Zulu prequel Zulu Dawn (1979), but by the early 1980s his film career had largely dissipated. Although he was originally considered for the part of Neville Hope in Auf Wiedersehen Pet, for much of the rest of the decade he worked as a carpenter and renovator after the part went to his close friend Kevin Whately. He also became an adherent of the teachings of Jiddu Krishnamurti. He embarked on several other unsuccessful projects as well: a board game, a television series focused on high-stakes backgammon, and a film about medical ethics. In 1999, he began writing a children's novel.

In 1999, when Kes was re-released in cinemas for the film's 30th anniversary, Bradley made hundreds of appearances in the United Kingdom with the film's other surviving cast members.

In 2003, Bradley appeared as the Catholic priest Father Michael, one of three leads in Nigel Barker's critically acclaimed independent film The Refuge (previously known as Asylum). He returned to the big screen alongside Jason Statham in the 2013 film Hummingbird.

On 8 September 2015, Bradley appeared in an episode of Holby City titled "An Eye for an Eye" as an elderly man who perceives himself as a "bad luck charm." In 2016, he revealed to The Guardian that he had penned a sequel to Kes, but that he had shelved the idea after original author Barry Hines' death.

Bradley was featured in Kit Monkman's new cinematic interpretation of Shakespeare's Macbeth as the Porter/Projectionist. The film was completed by GSP Studios in 2017 and was released in theatres across the UK on 13 March 2018.

Filmography

Film

Television

References

External links

English male film actors
1953 births
Living people
Actors from Barnsley
BAFTA Most Promising Newcomer to Leading Film Roles winners
English male television actors
Male actors from Yorkshire
20th-century English male actors
21st-century English male actors